Fredrik Appel (born 8 April 1991) is a Finnish footballer who currently plays for FC Aland as a defender.

References

Living people
1991 births
Finnish footballers
FC Åland players
Association football defenders